Richard Holler (born 9 November 1958) is a sailor from Austria, who represented his country at the 1984 Summer Olympics in Los Angeles, United States as crew member in the Soling. With helmsman Michael Farthofer and fellow crew member and brother Christian Holler they took the 15th place.

References

Living people
1958 births
Sailors at the 1984 Summer Olympics – Soling
Olympic sailors of Austria
Austrian male sailors (sport)